Jacob C. Martinson  was the president of High Point University from 1985 to 2005. He graduated from the Duke Divinity School in 1957. Dr. Martinson is an ordained United Methodist minister and has served as President of Andrew College in Georgia and Brevard College in North Carolina before assuming the presidency of High Point College in North Carolina, which under his presidency achieved university status. In 1994, Westminster College, Oxford, England, honored Dr. Martinson as Honorary Fellow, the first American so honored by Westminster. Dr. Martinson is currently a consultant with Lighthouse Strategies.

References

External links
Personal website

Heads of universities and colleges in the United States
Living people
20th-century births
Year of birth missing (living people)
Andrew College
Brevard College
High Point University people